Leroi Placet, known by his pen name Louis Paul (c. 1902 – February 13, 1970), was an American short story writer and novelist.

He corresponded with John Steinbeck. His work appeared in American Mercury and Esquire. He adapted his book Breakdown into the play The Cup of Trembling, which opened in Boston April 5, 1948.

Awards
 1934 O. Henry Award

Works

Anthologies

References

1900s births
1970 deaths
20th-century American novelists
American male novelists
Medalists at the FINA World Swimming Championships (25 m)
O. Henry Award winners
20th-century American male writers